Sandy Station may refer to:

the original name (or Sandy's Station) of Sandy, Utah
Sandy railway station, in Bedfordshire, England
Sandy Civic Center station, a Utah Transit Authority light rail station in Sandy, Utah
Sandy Creek station (PAAC), a Port Authority of Allegheny County light rail station in Bethel Park, Pennsylvania
Sandy Creek railway station, a former station in the Barossa Valley, South Australia
Sandy Expo station, a Utah Transit Authority light rail station in Sandy, Utah
Sandy Heath transmitting station, a television station in Bedfordshire, England
Sandy Lodge tube station, in Hertfordshire, England, later renamed Moor Park tube station
Sandy Springs station, a Metropolitan Atlanta Rapid Transit Authority metro station in Sandy Springs, Georgia
Historic Sandy station, a Utah Transit Authority light rail station in Sandy, Utah

Upper Sandy Guard Station Cabin, a U.S. Forest Service building in Mt. Hood National Forest, Clackamas County, Oregon